Mehmet Akyüz (born 2 January 1986) is a Turkish professional footballer who plays as a forward for Çorum FK.

References

External links
 
 

1986 births
Living people
Turkish footballers
Süper Lig players
TFF First League players
Sakaryaspor footballers
Fethiyespor footballers
Bozüyükspor footballers
Gençlerbirliği S.K. footballers
Şanlıurfaspor footballers
Hacettepe S.K. footballers
TKİ Tavşanlı Linyitspor footballers
Beşiktaş J.K. footballers
Çaykur Rizespor footballers
Giresunspor footballers
Denizlispor footballers
Adana Demirspor footballers
Samsunspor footballers
Turkey youth international footballers
Sportspeople from Adapazarı
Association football forwards